Mary Ann Casey (born November 11, 1949) is an American retired diplomat who was a career Foreign Service Officer and U.S. Ambassador to Algeria (1991–1994) and Tunisia (1994–1997).

Life and career
Casey was born in Boulder, Colorado on November 11, 1949. She graduated with a degree in international relations from the University of Colorado at Boulder in 1970, and spent most of her overseas career in northern Africa. Her first assignment was as vice consul and political officer at the U.S. Embassy in Morocco; her most recent overseas position was Ambassador to Tunisia. In between, she spent time as a Watch Officer in the State Department Operations Center, desk officer for Iraq, as a Hoover Institution National Fellow at Stanford, as Deputy Assistant Secretary of State for Intelligence and Research, and as the Ambassador to Algeria.

Upon returning from Tunisia, Ambassador Casey became the State Department's "Diplomat in Residence" at the University of Colorado at Boulder, where she helped establish the Smith Hall International Program, chaired the International Affairs committee of the University's Conference on World Affairs, and taught several courses on international relations.

Her foreign languages include Arabic and French.

Notes and references

External links

1949 births
Living people
People from Boulder, Colorado
Ambassadors of the United States to Algeria
Ambassadors of the United States to Tunisia
University of Colorado alumni
University of Colorado Boulder faculty
United States Foreign Service personnel
American women ambassadors
20th-century American diplomats
20th-century American women